The 1938 Boston Bees season was the 68th season of the franchise.

Offseason 
On January 8, 1938, Bob Smith was released by the Boston Bees. On February 16, 1938, Tommy Thevenow was released by the Bees.

Regular season 
On June 11, 1938, Johnny Vander Meer of the Cincinnati Reds threw a no-hitter against the Bees. It would be the first of two consecutive no-hitters that Vander Meer pitched.

Season standings

Record vs. opponents

Notable transactions 
 September 10, 1938: Oliver Hill was purchased by the Bees from the Atlanta Crackers.

Roster

Player stats

Batting

Starters by position 
Note: Pos = Position; G = Games played; AB = At bats; H = Hits; Avg. = Batting average; HR = Home runs; RBI = Runs batted in

Other batters 
Note: G = Games played; AB = At bats; H = Hits; Avg. = Batting average; HR = Home runs; RBI = Runs batted in

Pitching

Starting pitchers 
Note: G = Games pitched; IP = Innings pitched; W = Wins; L = Losses; ERA = Earned run average; SO = Strikeouts

Other pitchers 
Note: G = Games pitched; IP = Innings pitched; W = Wins; L = Losses; ERA = Earned run average; SO = Strikeouts

Relief pitchers 
Note: G = Games pitched; W = Wins; L = Losses; SV = Saves; ERA = Earned run average; SO = Strikeouts

Farm system

Notes

References 
1938 Boston Bees season at Baseball Reference

Boston Bees seasons
Boston Bees
Boston Bees
1930s in Boston